The arrondissement of Saint-Lô is an arrondissement of France in the Manche department in the Normandy region. It has 87 communes.

Composition

The communes of the arrondissement of Saint-Lô, and their INSEE codes, are:

 Agneaux (50002)
 Airel (50004)
 Amigny (50006)
 Auvers (50023)
 La Barre-de-Semilly (50032)
 Baudre (50034)
 Beaucoudray (50039)
 Bérigny (50046)
 Beslon (50048)
 Beuvrigny (50050)
 Biéville (50054)
 La Bloutière (50060)
 Bourguenolles (50069)
 Bourgvallées (50546)
 Canisy (50095)
 Carantilly (50098)
 Carentan-les-Marais (50099)
 Cavigny (50106)
 Cerisy-la-Forêt (50110)
 Champrepus (50118)
 Chérencé-le-Héron (50130)
 La Colombe (50137)
 Condé-sur-Vire (50139)
 Couvains (50148)
 Dangy (50159)
 Le Dézert (50161)
 Domjean (50164)
 Fleury (50185)
 Fourneaux (50192)
 Gouvets (50214)
 Graignes-Mesnil-Angot (50216)
 Le Guislain (50225)
 La Haye-Bellefond (50234)
 Lamberville (50261)
 La Lande-d'Airou (50262)
 Le Lorey (50279)
 La Luzerne (50283)
 Margueray (50291)
 Marigny-le-Lozon (50292)
 Maupertuis (50295)
 La Meauffe (50297)
 Méautis (50298)
 Le Mesnil-Amey (50302)
 Le Mesnil-Eury (50310)
 Le Mesnil-Rouxelin (50321)
 Le Mesnil-Véneron (50324)
 Montabot (50334)
 Montbray (50338)
 Montrabot (50351)
 Montreuil-sur-Lozon (50352)
 Moon-sur-Elle (50356)
 Morigny (50357)
 Moyon-Villages (50363)
 Percy-en-Normandie (50393)
 Le Perron (50398)
 Pont-Hébert (50409)
 Quibou (50420)
 Rampan (50423)
 Remilly-les-Marais (50431)
 Saint-Amand-Villages (50444)
 Saint-André-de-Bohon (50445)
 Saint-André-de-l'Épine (50446)
 Saint-Clair-sur-l'Elle (50455)
 Sainte-Cécile (50453)
 Sainte-Suzanne-sur-Vire (50556)
 Saint-Fromond (50468)
 Saint-Georges-d'Elle (50473)
 Saint-Georges-Montcocq (50475)
 Saint-Germain-d'Elle (50476)
 Saint-Gilles (50483)
 Saint-Jean-de-Daye (50488)
 Saint-Jean-d'Elle (50492)
 Saint-Jean-de-Savigny (50491)
 Saint-Lô (50502)
 Saint-Louet-sur-Vire (50504)
 Saint-Martin-de-Bonfossé (50512)
 Saint-Pierre-de-Semilly (50538)
 Saint-Vigor-des-Monts (50563)
 Terre-et-Marais (50564)
 Tessy-Bocage (50592)
 Thèreval (50239)
 Torigny-les-Villes (50601)
 Tribehou (50606)
 La Trinité (50607)
 Villebaudon (50637)
 Villedieu-les-Poêles-Rouffigny (50639)
 Villiers-Fossard (50641)

History

The arrondissement of Saint-Lô was created in 1800. At the January 2017 reorganisation of the arrondissements of Manche, it gained one commune from the arrondissement of Coutances, and it lost two communes to the arrondissement of Coutances.

As a result of the reorganisation of the cantons of France which came into effect in 2015, the borders of the cantons are no longer related to the borders of the arrondissements. The cantons of the arrondissement of Saint-Lô were, as of January 2015:

 Canisy
 Carentan
 Marigny
 Percy
 Saint-Clair-sur-l'Elle
 Saint-Jean-de-Daye
 Saint-Lô-Est
 Saint-Lô-Ouest
 Tessy-sur-Vire
 Torigni-sur-Vire
 Villedieu-les-Poêles

References

Arrondissements of Manche